Minoru Kihara may refer to: